Charles R. Hale (born 1957) is a scholar of Latin America, Africa, and the African diaspora. He was appointed Dean of Social Sciences at the University of California, Santa Barbara in 2018 and professor of global studies. He is a past president of the Latin American Studies Association (2006-2007). He earned an A.B. in Social Studies at Harvard College and his doctorate at Stanford University. His publications include two single-author books, which have been translated to Spanish,  “…más que un indio (more than an Indian)”: Racial Ambivalence and Neoliberal Multiculturalism in Guatemala; and Resistance and Contradiction: Miskitu Indians and the Nicaraguan State, 1894-1987.

References

External links
Portal: Web Magazine of the LLILAS Benson Latin American Studies and Collection, “Departing Reflections”
Charles Hale Researchgate accessed 4 June 2019

Harvard College alumni
Stanford University alumni
University of California, Davis faculty
University of Texas faculty
University of California, Santa Barbara faculty
Latin Americanists
Living people
1957 births